The Shattered Sphere is a science fiction book by the author Roger MacBride Allen. It is the second of The Hunted Earth series, preceded by The Ring of Charon.

1995 American novels
American science fiction novels
Novels by Roger MacBride Allen